Christian G. Fritz is a legal historian and a law professor at the University of New Mexico School of Law. He writes on U.S. constitutional history, and his 2007 book American Sovereigns: the People and America's Constitutional Tradition Before the Civil War, published by Cambridge University Press, traces the historical roots of popular sovereignty in U.S. law.

Fritz received his B.A. degree in 1975 and his Ph.D. in history in 1986 from the University of California, Berkeley and his J.D. degree in 1978 from the University of California, Hastings College of the Law.

References

External links
Choice Reviews Online
Hildref Publication Review
Law and Politics Book Review
Society for Early Americanists 
H-Net Review

Year of birth missing (living people)
Living people
Legal historians
University of New Mexico faculty
University of California, Hastings College of the Law alumni
University of California, Berkeley alumni